Davis Ridge is a ridge of irregular shape, apparently an outlier of the Mount Jackson massif, in Antarctica. It was mapped by the United States Geological Survey in 1974, and was named by the Advisory Committee on Antarctic Names for Brent L. Davis, a United States Antarctic Research Program biologist at Palmer Station, 1971, and in the Antarctic Peninsula area, 1974–75 season.

References 

Ridges of Palmer Land